Achaenodon is an extinct artiodactyl mammal, possibly belonging to the eloiids. It lived in the Mid-To-Upper Eocene (about 43-39 million years ago) and its fossil remains have been found in North America.

Description
This animal was large and looked vaguely like a wild boar, but the size of an American black bear (Ursus americanus): it was about two meters long and weighed about 285 kilograms. Achaenodon's snout was very short and sturdy, with large sideways expanded zygomatic arches, making the skull extremely wide. There was a very high sagittal crest, which connected later to an expanded nuchal crest; these two structures, together with the large cheekbone arches, indicate that the musculature of the jaws was extremely powerful.

Achaenodons teeth were characterized by large curved canines and large post-dumping teeth with a bunodont structure. The dental formula was typical of the artiodactyls with three incisors, a canine, four premolars and three molars; the first lower premolar was present in juveniles and, growing up, was expelled due to the growth of the canine. The upper molars were square in shape and equipped with four large conical cusps, surrounded by sturdy precingulation and postcingulation and extraordinarily thickened enamel. One particular species (A. frendi) still possessed protoconule and hypoconus, which disappeared in the other achenodonts.

'Achaenodons front legs were short and the hand had four fingers. The hind legs were slightly longer.

Classification
First described in 1893 by Edward Drinker Cope, Achaenodon is best known for fossil remains from the Wyoming Middle Eocene. The type species is Achaenodon insolens, but other species (A. robustus, A. uintense, A. frendi) are also known, from California, Oregon, Utah, and Wyoming. The affinities of Achaenodon are unclear: for a long time this animal has been classified among the entelodontids, the so-called "terror pigs" typical of the Oligocene and Miocene; this classification was mainly due to the large size of Achaenodon and the similarities in the particularly massive teeth. In fact, the similarities between Achaenodon and entelodonts were mainly due to evolutionary convergence and the development of characteristics due to the large size

It is likely, however, that Achaenodon was a highly specialized representative of the heloiids (Helohyidae), a group of primitive artiodactyls typical of the North American and Asian Eocene, usually much smaller in size. Achaenodon, if it had actually been a giant eloiid, would also have been the last representative of the family (except the Mexican Simojovelhyus, dating back to the Upper Oligocene). An animal closely related to Achaenodon is Parahyus, of smaller size. Other studies have indicated that Achaenodon could be a baseline representative of the Cetancodontamorpha group.

Paleoecology
The large size of Achaenodon made it a difficult target for middle Eocene carnivores. Achaenodon was the first large artiodactyl, and remained the only artiodactyl to be part of the megafauna throughout the Eocene; even after the disappearance of this animal, there were no other large artiodactyls for at least 5 million years, with the appearance of Archaeotherium.

References 

Helohyids
Prehistoric even-toed ungulate genera
Clarno Formation